Live on Tour in the Far East is a live album led by saxophonist Billy Harper recorded in 1991 in Korea and released on the SteepleChase label. The album was followed by two additional volumes recorded on the same tour.

Reception 

In his review for AllMusic, Don Snowden states "On Tour, Vol. 1 shows an impressive musical range, great command of dynamics and is just loaded with really sharp, smart, excellent music once it hits its stride. And it's probably the least exciting of these three discs released from a tour that should have established Billy Harper's quintet as a major group in the jazz world".

Track listing 
All compositions by Billy Harper except as indicated
 "I Do Believe" - 15:27
 "Countdown" (John Coltrane) - 5:12 		
 "Dance in the Question" (Francesca Tanksley) - 13:41
 "Insight" - 11:21 		
 "If One Could Only See" - 5:01 		
 "Croquet Ballet" - 14:50

Personnel 
Billy Harper - tenor saxophone
 Eddie Henderson - trumpet
Francesca Tanksley - piano
Louie Spears - bass
Newman Taylor Baker - drums

References 

1992 live albums
Billy Harper live albums
SteepleChase Records live albums